Anthony Bendel (born 19 July 1931) is a South African cricketer. He played in one first-class match for Eastern Province in 1963/64.

See also
 List of Eastern Province representative cricketers

References

External links
 

1931 births
Living people
South African cricketers
Eastern Province cricketers
Cricketers from Greater London